SkyUp Airlines LLC is a Ukrainian charter and low-cost airline headquartered in Kyiv, which began its operation in May 2018. During 2021, the airline carried 2,546,899 passengers, performed 15,962 flights, and transported 786.5 tons of cargo. Its staff is 1172 employees.

History
In 2016, SkyUp became a registered company in Kyiv, Ukraine. On 14 December 2017, Minister of Infrastructure Volodymyr Omelyan announced the launch of a new national private air carrier named SkyUp Airlines. The main shareholders of the company were ACS-Ukraine Ltd, Yuri Alba and Tatyana Alba, who also owned the tour operator Join UP!, which was expected to cooperate with the airline to provide charter flights for holiday packages.

Plans for the first year included concentrating on international charter flights to popular summer destinations, as well as scheduled flights within Ukraine and to several international destinations. Tickets sales were set to begin in April 2018. SkyUp also intends to cooperate with Ukraine International Airlines.

The company started operations on 21 May 2018 with a flight from Kyiv-Zhuliany to Sharm El Sheikh. In March 2018, SkyUp Airlines and Boeing finalised a firm order for the purchase of two Boeing 737 8 MAX and three Boeing 737 MAX 10 due to be delivered in 2023. Additionally the airline has the option to purchase another five aircraft. At its launch the airline intended to operate charter flights from both Kyiv-Boryspil and Kyiv-Zhuliany, as well as Kharkiv, Lviv, Odessa and other cities in Ukraine to a total of sixteen destinations: Alicante, Antalya, Barcelona, Bodrum, Burgas, Dalaman, Dubai, Hurghada, Larnaca, Palma de Mallorca, Nice, Rimini, Sharm El Sheikh, Tenerife, Tivat, Tel Aviv and Varna. Following the launch of the charter operations, the airline planned to commence domestic services from Odessa to Kyiv, Kharkiv and Lviv in late May or early June 2018. The airline also intended to operate international services from Kyiv to Barcelona, Dubai and Larnaca. 

In February 2019, the airline announced it would be moving its main base from the Zhuliany to Boryspil from the beginning of the summer schedule. The airline said that the decision to change the home airport was made due to restrictions on the operation of aircraft at Zhuliany Airport. Also in 2019 SkyUp was hit by court attack with controversial guilty verdicts resulted in their license being suspended. However, journalists revealed that the woman, who allegedly appealed to the court, said she had never been SkyUp’s client and did not appeal to the court. Prime Minister of Ukraine, as well as Minister of Infrastructure called the court attack suspicious. Later guilty verdicts and license suspension were recalled, while the judge, responsible for the illegal verdict, was dismissed.

On 20 February 2020, one of the airline's planes was chartered by the Ukrainian government to evacuate citizens from Wuhan during the COVID-19 pandemic, which was back then not a pandemic.

In 2021 SkyUp became the first Ukrainian airline to launch direct flights from Saudi Arabia to Ukraine.

In October 2021, a new uniform for flight attendants was introduced: high-heeled shoes were replaced by sneakers, and trouser suits instead of skirts.

SkyUp Airlines won the «Heart of Airspace» nomination according to the «Ukraine Tourism Awards 2021».

On 24 February 2022, coinciding with the closure of Ukrainian airspace to civil aviation traffic, SkyUp canceled all flights through 6 March 2022. Since the beginning of the Russian invasion, the airline has been conducting evacuation and humanitarian flights, as well as providing wet leasing for its fleet.

Destinations

As of October 2021, SkyUp serves 64 scheduled year-round and seasonal destinations from airports in Ukraine, some of which are operated as charters. The airline mainly serves routes throughout Europe and the Middle East.

Fleet
As of December 2021, SkyUp Airlines operates the following aircraft:

In Culture
The aircraft and uniform of SkyUp flight attendants appear in Max Barskih’s video Just Fly.

See also
 List of airlines of Ukraine

References

External links

 

Airlines of Ukraine
Airlines established in 2016
Low-cost carriers
Ukrainian companies established in 2016